Ambrose Alli University Library, situated in its parent institution, was established after the formation of the university in 1982 by the then Governor of Bendel State (now Edo and Delta states), Professor Ambrose Folorunso Alli (1979 – 1983).

History 
First known as Bendel State University Library, then to Edo State University Library It was later changed to its present name in commemoration of the founder, Prof. Ambrose Folorunso Alli in 1991. The university library is centrally located for easy access by the university community.

The university library in its early years of existence in 1982, witnessed series of movements in search of a befitting accommodation. The first movement was from its makeshift office in the University Guest House at Ikhiro Road to a temporary administrative block in the then Okpebho Local Government Secretariat. By November, 1982, the library moved for the second time to another temporary administrative location of a three bedroom bungalow at Ukpenu along Benin-Auchi Expressway before moving for the third time to Emaudo Campus in December, 1982. The Emaudo Campus being the initial permanent site provided a more enabling environment for the library to operate satisfactorily.

However, in 1987, the library moved for the fourth time to a relatively more congenial academic environment located at Ujemen, now the permanent site of the university along Benin-Auchi Expressway. On May 15, 1999, a definitive 3-storey library building occupying approximately 14,000m2 with a seating capacity of 2,500 was commissioned by the then Head of State, General Abdulsalam Abubakar.

In September 10, 2017, the library was having four main outreach libraries which includes; the Clinical Library situated at the Faculty of Clinical sciences beside the Irrua Specialist Teaching Hospital, Irrua. Medical Library, located at the College of Medicine, Emaudo Annex Library located at the school of part-time, pre-degree and Agriculture, and Law Library situated at the Faculty of Law at the main campus. Each of these libraries mentioned above all have their unique roles and function to the academic excellence of the university.

Administration 

Chronology of Past University librarians
Dr. Frederick Odion (acting University librarian)
Dr. (Mrs.) Margaret Onobha Momodu (2021)
Dr. (Mrs.) Jane I. Aba (2015–2021)
Dr (Mrs.) Juliana B. Amune (2014–2015)
Dr. (Mrs.) E.I Ifidon (2003–2014)
Mr. Ojo-Igbinoba (1997–2003)
Professor Sam Ifidon (1982–1997)

Location of faculty libraries 
Agricultural Library – Emaudo Campus
Law Library – Faculty of Law
Clinical Library – Faculty of Clinical Science
Medical College Library – College of Medicine
Library and Information Science Library (Media Resource Center) – Dept. of LIS
Management Science Library – Faculty of Management Science
Data Room Unit Library – Faculty of Environmental Studies
Education Library - Faculty of Education

Collections 
The library became fully operational in 1983, with a book stock of 36,509 volumes, being 30,818 books and 5691 government documents, and 369 journal titles.

The library as of 2021 has a holding of more than 223,870 volumes of books, 102,099 journals, magazines, thesis/dissertations, government and special collections. The library operates a hybrid library system as it provides print and non-print information sources in CDs, e-books, e-journals, and 21 databases that cut across all fields of academic programmes of the institution.

Services

The library provides materials and services that support the university's academic programmes in teaching, learning, and research. It provides information materials to meet the needs of students (undergraduates and postgraduates),lecturers and other researchers. 

The services include but not limited to:

Wireless access points: the availability of wireless connectivity makes it easy for library user to access the internet and/or networked resources on phones and laptop computers

Reprographic and bindery services: the reprographic unit provides ethical use of library of information sources. While the bindery section carries out the repair of worn-out library books and binding of project work.

Circulation services:

Institutional repository: the university intellectual/research output is constantly being digitized and made accessible to library users.

Reference services: there is provision of reference information services across various disciplines for students and faculty

Loaning or borrowing of books: The library allows library users to borrow books.

References 

Ambrose Alli University
Academic libraries in Nigeria